Xitucheng station is an interchange station on Line 10 and Changping line of the Beijing Subway.

History 
From September 19, 2021 to January 8, 2022, the station for Line 10 was renovated in preparation for interchange with the southern extension of the Changping line. Additionally, new stairs and escalators where added and station concourses were expanded. It reopened on January 9, 2022.

The station for Changping line opened on February 4, 2023.

Station Layout 
The station underground island platforms for both Line 10 and Changping line.

Exits 
There are 6 exits, lettered A, B, C, D, E and F. Exits B, C and E are accessible via elevators.

Station Art
The Changping line station has 3 murals. The station hall has a mural named 'Tucheng Seal', the lintel wall of the escalator from the station hall to the north and south sides of the platform has a mural named 'Treading Flowers and Going Back', and the ceiling of the transfer passage is decorated with a mural named 'Sky Reverie'.

Gallery

References

External links

Beijing Subway stations in Haidian District